Opercularia ovata is a species of plant in the family Rubiaceae.

Description

Range

Habitat

Ecology

Etymology

Taxonomy

References

ovata